Rock Me is the  debut album of Romanian born German singer Platnum (aka Miss Platnum), released with the Indie label Sonar Kollektiv. Unlike her second album Chefa, it did not appear at the German or Romanian charts.

Track listing
"Rock Me" (02:22)
"Sweet City" (04:12)
"Leave Me, Baby" (03:17)
"Crush On You" (02:55)
"Obsession" (04:19)
"Cocaine Part II" (02:50)
"Get Away" (04:17)
"Come to My House" (03:28)
"Drink My Wine" (04:04)
"Greatest" (04:28)
"Two Stars" (04:33)
"What's Your Name?" (02:16)
"She Won't Do It" (03:19)
"The Day II" (05:08)
"The Day I" (04:56)

External links
Platnum's artist page on Sonar Kollektiv
Official website of the album
"Rock Me" on BBC Collective

Miss Platnum albums
Sonar Kollektiv albums
2005 debut albums